The 1986 Champion Spark Plug 400 was a NASCAR Winston Cup Series racing event that was held on August 17, 1986, at Michigan International Speedway in Brooklyn, Michigan.

Michigan International Speedway has been a Ford dominated track starting in 1984, and a Mercury track before that from 1969-78. It was also a track that suited a smooth driver or a driver that could change his driving tactics for Michigan International Speedway.

Background
Opened in 1968, the track's turns are banked at eighteen degrees, while the 3,600-foot-long front stretch, the location of the finish line, is banked at twelve degrees. The back stretch, has a five degree banking and is 2,242 feet long.

Groundbreaking took place on September 28, 1967. Over  of dirt were moved to form the D-shaped oval. The track opened in 1968 with a total capacity of 25,000 seats. The track was originally built and owned by Lawrence H. LoPatin, a Detroit-area land developer who built the speedway at an estimated cost of $4–6 million. Financing was arranged by Thomas W Itin. Its first race took place on Sunday, October 13, 1968, with the running of the USAC 250 mile Championship Car Race won by Ronnie Bucknum.

In 1972, Roger Penske purchased the speedway for an estimated $2 million. During Penske's ownership, the track was upgraded several times from the original capacity to 125,000 seating capacity.

Race report
There were 41 drivers on the starting grid for this event. Gary Fedewa (uncle of later Busch Series driver Tim Fedewa), Dick Trickle, USAC veteran Cliff Hucul of Canada, Ronnie Thomas, Joe Booher, and Howard Mark failed to qualify for this race. In this 200-lap event, Buddy Baker deserved his last-place finish due to a problem with the rear end of his vehicle on lap 27. Various problems including engine troubles and crashes caused several drivers not to finish the race. All of the drivers in this racing event were born in the United States of America, and prior to the green flag the total number of Winston Cup wins among all 41 drivers equaled 672, and a total of 20 Winston Cups.

Sixty-four thousand people witnessed a race lasting for almost three hours. Bill Elliott managed to defeat Tim Richmond by almost one and a half seconds. Tim Richmond continued his hot streak across the summer stretch, leading five laps and finishing in second place. Richmond charged from the tail-end of the lead pack to second on the final restart after being penalized by NASCAR for pitting too early under caution. After getting his lap back, Richmond charged through the field to take second.

Benny Parsons earned the pole position for this racing event by driving up to  during qualifying. While the opening laps in the race saw four different drivers duel each other for the lead, only Bill Elliott and Darrell Waltrip would be able to fight for the first-place position on the closing laps. Darrell Waltrip ran a clean race, staying inside the top-5 for most of the afternoon and leading 3 laps. He was rewarded with a third-place finish. Michael Waltrip would become the lowest-finishing driver to finish the race; even though he only logged in 122 laps of actual racing. Greg Sacks was involved in an accident on lap 63 while Morgan Shepherd had a similar collision on lap 83. There was a two-car crash on lap 173 involving Kyle Petty and Jim Hull. The last accident of the race occurred on lap 187 involving Benny Parsons.

Geoff Bodine led 21 laps en route to a fourth-place finish. Bodine easily had the best car before the competition caution NASCAR scheduled to check tire wear. After the competition caution, Bodine was unable to find the top spot for the rest of the afternoon. Dale Earnhardt finished a lap down in fifth place. Earnhardt was the only driver able to keep up with Bill Elliott, leading 34 laps throughout the day. After getting caught a lap down during a round of green-flag pitstops, Earnhardt settled for a top-5. Rusty Wallace managed to lead a lap and came home in sixth, one lap down. Wallace was driving on the edge for most of the race, nearly spinning out at one point while battling with Morgan Shepherd for position.

Bill Elliott looked like his 1985 self, leading 125 of 200 laps and claiming his second victory of the season. The win was his fourth consecutive victory at Michigan and his fifth victory in six races at the speedway. Between 1984 and 1987, Elliott won all but two races at Michigan. The most dominant drivers in the NASCAR Winston Cup Series during the 1980s were Bill Elliott, Darrell Waltrip, Terry Labonte, Bobby Allison, and Dale Earnhardt.

Cale Yarborough recovered from a terrible qualifying effort to finish seventh, one lap down. Yarborough drafted with Bobby Allison into the top-10 by lap 20 and was challenging the leaders at one point before falling a lap down. Harry Gant finished a lap down in eighth, ending what had been a brutal four-race stretch in which he suffered engine failure at Daytona, crashed hard at Pocono and Talladega, and blown his motor at Watkins Glen. Phil Parsons nabbed his third top-ten finish of the season with a ninth-place run, though he was a lap down. Like many others, Parsons was caught out by a caution during green-flag pitstops, which is why so many drivers in the top-10 were a lap down at the finish.

The total prize purse for the contenders in this event was $345,585 ($ in today's American dollars). Winnings for each individual driver varied from $55,950 ($ in today's American dollars) to a meager $1,185 ($ in today's American dollars).

Introductions and retirements
Benny Parsons would make his final pole position start here while David Pearson and Jim Hull would make their respective exits from the NASCAR Cup Series after this event was over. In the final start of his legendary career, David Pearson showed that he could still be competitive, running as high as third and finishing in tenth place, one lap off the pace.

Pearson would go on to become "racing royalty" at Michigan International Speedway due to his incredible performances on that race track alone. While starting an average of 8th place on all NASCAR races that took place on Michigan International Speedway, Pearson's average finish of 12th place would be accompanied by nine other MIS racing victories and twenty finishes in the "top ten."

Results

Standings after the race

References

Champion Spark Plug
Champion Spark Plug 400
NASCAR races at Michigan International Speedway